Guido Silberbach (born 24 May 1967) is a retired German football striker.

References

1967 births
Living people
German footballers
SG Wattenscheid 09 players
Bundesliga players
2. Bundesliga players
Association football forwards